Maksim Pichugin may refer to:

 Maksim Pichugin (footballer) (born 1998), Russian football player
 Maksim Pichugin (skier) (born 1974), Russian Olympic skier